Lieutenant-Colonel Arthur John Bigge, 1st Baron Stamfordham,  (18 June 1849 – 31 March 1931) was a British Army officer and courtier. He was Private Secretary to Queen Victoria during the last few years of her reign, and to George V during most of his reign. He was the maternal grandfather of Lord Adeane, Private Secretary to Elizabeth II from 1953 to 1972.

Early life
Bigge was the son of John Frederick Bigge (1814–1885), Vicar of Stamfordham, Northumberland, and the grandson of Charles William Bigge (1773–1849) of Benton House (Little Benton, Newcastle upon Tyne, Northumberland) and Linden Hall (Longhorsley, Northumberland), High Sheriff of Northumberland and a prominent merchant and banker in Newcastle upon Tyne. He was educated at Rossall School and the Royal Military Academy and was commissioned into the Royal Artillery in 1869.

Career
Between 1878 and 1879, Bigge fought in the Anglo-Zulu War, as is known from his mentions in despatches. In 1880, he was summoned to Balmoral Castle by Queen Victoria to give an explanation on the Prince Imperial's death in the Zulu War. Before he was appointed as a Private Secretary, he had served as a groom-in-waiting and assistant private secretary to Queen Victoria. In 1881, he was appointed equerry-in-ordinary.

Bigge was appointed Private Secretary to Queen Victoria in 1895 and served until her death in January 1901. A couple of months later, he was appointed Private Secretary to her grandson, the Duke of Cornwall and York, who was made Prince of Wales later that year. He continued to serve as such on the Prince's accession to the throne as King George V in 1910 and serving until his own death in 1931. As Private Secretary to the sovereign he was sworn of the Privy Council in 1910 and elevated to the peerage as Baron Stamfordham, of Stamfordham in the County of Northumberland, in 1911.

Bigge seemed to have an influence over King George and was one of those who supported the King's decision to adopt Windsor as the family name because of the keen anti-German feelings during World War I. On 17 July 1917, King George V "issued a proclamation declaring, "The Name of Windsor is to be borne by His Royal House and Family and Relinquishing the Use of All German Titles and Dignities". He persuaded the King to deny asylum to Tsar Nicholas II and his family, who were thus forced to remain in Russia and who were murdered by the Bolsheviks. He interpreted the King's response "Bugger Bognor" as assent to the renaming of Bognor as Bognor Regis.
He introduced the Duke of York (later King George VI) to Lionel Logue, who became the Duke's speech therapist.

Family
Bigge married in 1881 Constance Neville (d. 1922), daughter of Rev. William Frederick Neville, Vicar of Butleigh, Somerset : they had a son and two daughters.  Their son, Captain The Hon. John Neville Bigge (b. 1887), was killed in action near Festubert on 15 May 1915 whilst serving with the 1st Bn. King's Royal Rifle Corps. He is commemorated on Le Touret Memorial. A daughter, the Honourable Victoria Eugenie, married Captain Henry Robert Augustus Adeane.  She was the mother of Michael Adeane, Baron Adeane, Private Secretary to Elizabeth II from 1953 to 1972.

Lord Stamfordham died, still in office, at St James's Palace on 31  March 1931, aged 81, when the barony became extinct.

Honours
British
KCB : Knight Commander of the Most Honourable Order of the Bath (KCB) – 1895
GCVO: Knight Grand Cross of the Royal Victorian Order (GCVO) – 2 February 1901 – on the day of the funeral of Queen Victoria
KCMG: Knight Commander of the Order of St Michael and St George (KCMG) – 26 November 1901
ISO: Imperial Service Order – 1903.
KCSI: Knight Commander – 1906.
PC : Privy Counsellor – 11 June 1910
GCIE : Knight Grand Commander – 1911
GCB : Knight Grand Cross – 1916.
 He received the George V Version of the Royal Household Long and Faithful Service Medal with 30 year service bar.

Foreign
 : Order of the White Lion

References

1849 births
1931 deaths
People from Morpeth, Northumberland
Military personnel from Northumberland
Royal Artillery officers
British Army personnel of the Anglo-Zulu War
Companions of the Imperial Service Order
Knights Grand Cross of the Order of the Bath
Knights Grand Cross of the Royal Victorian Order
Knights Grand Commander of the Order of the Indian Empire
Knights Commander of the Order of the Star of India
Knights Commander of the Order of St Michael and St George
Members of the Privy Council of the United Kingdom
Barons in the Peerage of the United Kingdom
People educated at Rossall School
Private Secretaries to the Sovereign
Barons created by George V
People from Stamfordham